The 1992 Lucerne Ladies European Open was a women's tennis tournament played on outdoor clay courts at the Tennis Club Lido in Lucerne, Switzerland that was part of the Tier IV category of the 1992 WTA Tour. It was the 16th edition of the tournament and was held from 18 May until 24 May 1992. Second-seeded Amy Frazier won the singles title and earned $27,000 first-prize money.

Finals

Singles
 Amy Frazier defeated  Radka Zrubáková 6–4, 4–6, 7–5
 It was Frazier's 1st singles title of the year and the 3rd of her career.

Doubles
 Amy Frazier /  Elna Reinach defeated  Karina Habšudová /  Marianne Werdel 7–5, 6–2

References

External links
 ITF tournament edition details
 Tournament draws

European Open
WTA Swiss Open
Sport in Lucerne
1992 in Swiss tennis
1992 in Swiss women's sport